Balianwala is a city in Chiniot District, Punjab, Pakistan, about 150 km from Lahore and 117 mi (or 188 km) south of Islamabad.

It is also within reasonable travelling distance of Kabul, Wad Saiyidan, Thatti Khudayan, Sheikhupura, Sargodha and Bonkne, as well as Thatta Rahmu, Rattapur Bala, Pakka, Mungi Thalli, Mandrana and Baghanwala.

There are 2 airports near Balianwala, of which the closer one is Faisalabad International Airport (IATA: LYP) 38 mi (or 61.9 km) south of the city centre of Balianwala.

Populated places in Chiniot District